This article is about the particular significance of the year 1818 to Wales and its people.

Incumbents
Lord Lieutenant of Anglesey – Henry Paget, 1st Marquess of Anglesey 
Lord Lieutenant of Brecknockshire and Monmouthshire – Henry Somerset, 6th Duke of Beaufort
Lord Lieutenant of Caernarvonshire – Thomas Bulkeley, 7th Viscount Bulkeley
Lord Lieutenant of Cardiganshire – William Edward Powell
Lord Lieutenant of Carmarthenshire – George Rice, 3rd Baron Dynevor 
Lord Lieutenant of Denbighshire – Sir Watkin Williams-Wynn, 5th Baronet    
Lord Lieutenant of Flintshire – Robert Grosvenor, 1st Marquess of Westminster 
Lord Lieutenant of Glamorgan – John Crichton-Stuart, 2nd Marquess of Bute 
Lord Lieutenant of Merionethshire – Sir Watkin Williams-Wynn, 5th Baronet
Lord Lieutenant of Montgomeryshire – Edward Clive, 1st Earl of Powis
Lord Lieutenant of Pembrokeshire – Richard Philipps, 1st Baron Milford
Lord Lieutenant of Radnorshire – George Rodney, 3rd Baron Rodney

Bishop of Bangor – Henry Majendie 
Bishop of Llandaff – Herbert Marsh
Bishop of St Asaph – John Luxmoore 
Bishop of St Davids – Thomas Burgess

Events
31 March - Joseph Tregelles Price and his partners take out a new lease on Neath Abbey ironworks.
June - In the United Kingdom general election:
Samuel Homfray becomes MP for Stafford.
John Jones of Ystrad fails to win Carmarthen.
Berkeley Thomas Paget, MP for Anglesey, retires from Parliament. 
John Edwards becomes MP for Glamorganshire.
August - John Jenkins (Ifor Ceri), parson of Kerry, and Thomas Burgess, Bishop of St David's, agree "to make an attempt to rekindle the bardic skill and ingenuity of the principality ... by holding eisteddfodau in different places in the four provinces".
date unknown
Richard Fothergill retires from his role in managing the Tredegar ironworks with Samuel Homfray. The Sirhowy Ironworks, previously run by Fothergill, is leased to Messrs. Harford of Ebbw Vale.
The first slate quarry on the site of what will become Oakeley quarry in Blaenau Ffestiniog (which will be the world's largest underground slate mine) is begun when Samuel Holland, a Liverpool merchant, leases land near Rhiwbryfdir farm from the landlords, the Oakeley family of Plas Tan y Bwlch.
Joseph Harris (Gomer) re-founds the periodical Seren Gomer.
John Jones (Jac Glan-y-gors) becomes landlord of the King's Head in Ludgate Street, London. His tavern becomes a meeting place for the London Welsh.

Arts and literature
Poet Felicia Hemans effectively separates from her husband, who goes to live in Rome for his health.

Awards
Evan Evans (Ieuan Glan Geirionydd) wins the chair at an eisteddfod in St Asaph.

New books
Nicholas Carlisle - A Concise Description of the Endowed Grammar Schools in England and Wales
Charles Norris - A Historical Account of Tenby

Music
Owen Williams - Egwyddorion Canu

Births
11 January - Daniel Silvan Evans, lexicographer (d. 1903)
10 February - David Lloyd Isaac, author (d. 1876)
27 February - Joseph Jenkins, the "Welsh Swagman", poet and diarist (d. 1898)
5 November - Edward James Herbert, 3rd Earl of Powis (d. 1891)
16 November - Evan Lewis, Dean of Bangor (d. 1901)
29 November - Richard Davies, MP (d. 1896)
18 December - David Davies (Llandinam), industrialist and philanthropist (d. 1890)
date unknown - George Augustus Frederick Paget, politician

Deaths
21 March - Charles Morgan, Commander-in-Chief of British forces in India, 76
15 July - Robert Williams, hymn-writer, 35 
12 September - John Thomas (Eos Gwynedd), poet, 76
13 September - William Richards, minister)
17 September - Albemarle Bertie, 9th Earl of Lindsey, father of Lady Charlotte Guest, 74

References

 
Wales